James Township may refer to several places:

Canada 
 James, Ontario, a township in Timiskaming District

United States 
 James Township, Scott County, Arkansas
 James Township, Pottawattamie County, Iowa
 James Township, Michigan

See also 
 St. James Township (disambiguation)
 James (disambiguation)

Township name disambiguation pages